Commander Norman Eyre Morley,  (6 January 1899 – 21 September 1989) was a British Naval Reserve officer who served in both World Wars, becoming the most decorated reserve officer in the Royal Navy, and the only person to have been awarded the Distinguished Service Cross four times.

Early life
Morley was born in Fulham in 1899, and educated at Battersea Grammar School, before joining the Harrison-Rennie Line as an apprentice.

World War I and the Baltic
Morley joined the Royal Naval Reserve on 14 November 1916 as a midshipman, and served aboard the battleship  in the Home Fleet. On 18 February 1919 he was promoted to the acting rank of sub-lieutenant, and served aboard HM Coastal Motor Boat No. 88 in the Baltic.

Between the wars
From 1920 Morley studied architecture at London University, and then worked for the brewing company Courage, for which he eventually became Chief Architect and Property Technical Director. He also served in the Royal Naval Volunteer Reserve being promoted to sub-lieutenant on 11 October 1921, and lieutenant on 11 April 1924, until being removed from list on 31 March 1933.

World War II
Morley returned to the RNVR soon after the outbreak of the Second World War, being commissioned as a lieutenant on 8 November 1939. He was promoted to acting lieutenant-commander in February 1941 and on 18 April 1941 was appointed to command of the minesweeper , based at the Nore. On 31 March 1942 he received a mention in despatches for his "courage, skill and endurance while minesweeping in dangerous waters".

On 31 January 1945 he was promoted to commander.

On 27 March 1945 Morley was awarded a second bar to the Distinguished Service Cross "for distinguished service and gallantry during the invasion of the South of France", and his third bar on 12 June 1945 "for gallantry, outstanding skill and devotion to duty in minesweeping operations over dense and shallow minefields in the opening up of Greek ports in the Gulf of Corinth".

Post-war life
Morley left the Navy after the end of the war, and returned to civilian employment. He retired in 1964 and bought a farm in Selborne, Hampshire. He was a founder and commodore of the Frensham Pond Sailing Club, continuing to sail into his 80s. Morley died in 1989 aged 90. His medals are held by the Royal Navy Museum at Portsmouth.

Other awards
As well as his four DSCs Morley also received the following campaign medals:

World War I
  Distinguished Service Cross 
  British War Medal
  Mercantile Marine War Medal
  Victory Medal

World War II
  Three bars to the DSC
  1939–1945 Star
  Atlantic Star
  Italy Star
  War Medal 1939–1945 with bronze oak leaf

References

1899 births
1989 deaths
People from Fulham
People educated at Battersea Grammar School
Alumni of the University of London
Royal Navy officers of World War I
Royal Navy officers of World War II
Recipients of the Distinguished Service Cross (United Kingdom)
People from Selborne
Royal Naval Reserve personnel